Agelasta mouhotii is a species of beetle in the family Cerambycidae. It was described by Francis Polkinghorne Pascoe in 1862. It is known from Laos, Cambodia and Vietnam.

References

mouhotii
Beetles described in 1862
Taxa named by Francis Polkinghorne Pascoe